Hristo Georgiev may refer to:

 Hristo Georgiev (patron), Bulgarian, funded the construction of Sofia University
 Hristo Georgiev (canoeist), Bulgarian sprint canoer